Accent on Tenor Sax is an album by saxophonist Coleman Hawkins which was recorded in 1955 for the Urania label.

Reception

Ron Wynn on AllMusic states, "A mid-'50s tenor sax workout by the immortal soloist Coleman Hawkins. This was originally issued on Urania and wasn't spectacular, but did have some nicely played blues and ballads".

Track listing
 "I'll Never Be the Same" (Matty Malneck, Frank Signorelli) – 7:13
 "Blue Room" (Richard Rodgers, Lorenz Hart) – 4:44 	
 "When Your Lover Has Gone" (Einar Aaron Swan) – 4:59
 "Running Wild" (A.H. Gibbs, Joe Grey, Leo Wood) – 3:23	
 "The Breeze and I" (Ernesto Lecuona) – 3:18	
 "What's New?" (Bob Haggart, Johnny Burke) – 5:48	
 "I'll String Along with You" (Harry Warren, Al Dubin) – 4:48	
 "My Own Blues" (Coleman Hawkins) – 6:03

Personnel
Coleman Hawkins – tenor saxophone
Ernie Royal – trumpet
Eddie Bert – trombone (tracks 2, 3, 6 & 8)
Earl Knight – piano, organ
Sidney Gross – guitar
Wendell Marshall – bass
Osie Johnson – drums

References

Coleman Hawkins albums
1955 albums